Hangest-sur-Somme (literally Hangest on Somme) is a commune in the Somme department in Hauts-de-France in northern France.

Geography
Hangest station has rail connections to Amiens and Abbeville.

Population

Notable people
 

 Herménégilde Duchaussoy (1854–1934), meteorologist

See also
Communes of the Somme department

References

Communes of Somme (department)